Mathew Barzal (born May 26, 1997) is a Canadian professional ice hockey forward for the New York Islanders of the National Hockey League (NHL). Barzal was selected by the Islanders in the first round, 16th overall, of the 2015 NHL Entry Draft. He won the Calder Memorial Trophy as the NHL's top rookie in 2017–18, the fifth Islander to win the award.

Playing career

Amateur
Barzal played in the 2010 Quebec International Pee-Wee Hockey Tournament with his youth team from Burnaby. He was selected first overall by the Seattle Thunderbirds of the Western Hockey League (WHL) in the 2012 WHL Bantam Draft. In his rookie season with the Thunderbirds in the 2013–14 season, Barzal scored 14 goals and 40 assists for 54 points. He was ranked seventh in the NHL's midterm rankings ahead of the 2015 NHL Entry Draft.

New York Islanders
Barzal was selected 16th overall by the New York Islanders in the 2015 NHL Entry Draft. On September 10, he signed a three-year, entry-level contract with the Islanders.

On October 15, 2016, Barzal made his NHL debut. He returned to the Thunderbirds and won the 2017 WHL championship as Barzal was named WHL Playoff MVP after registering 25 points (7 goals and 18 assists) in 16 games.

Barzal's first NHL point came on October 15, 2017, against the Los Angeles Kings when he assisted on a goal by Josh Bailey. Barzal's first NHL goal came on October 19 against Henrik Lundqvist of the New York Rangers.

Barzal's first multi-point NHL game came on October 26, 2017, when he had a goal and an assist playing against the Minnesota Wild. The goal, the second of his career, came in the waning seconds of the Islanders' 6–4 loss. Barzal's first NHL power play goal (and also his first NHL goal at home) came on October 30 against the Vegas Golden Knights. Barzal set a franchise record for assists by a rookie when he recorded five assists on November 5 in a 6–4 Islanders win over the Colorado Avalanche. This also tied the franchise record for points in a game by a rookie.

Barzal's first multi-goal game and his first hat-trick came on December 23, 2017, against the Winnipeg Jets in a 5–2 Islanders win. On January 13, 2018, in a 7–2 win over the Rangers, he became just the fifth player in NHL history to have two five-point games in a season before his 21st birthday. On February 9, 2018, in a 7–6 victory over the Detroit Red Wings, Barzal became the first NHL rookie to record three five-point games in a season since Joe Malone did so in the 1917–18 season. On April 7, Barzal tied the Islanders record (held by Bryan Trottier) for most assists by a rookie with 63. On April 22, Barzal was named a finalist for the Calder Memorial Trophy, which is awarded to the best rookie in the NHL. On June 20, he won the award. Barzal and Kyle Okposo are the only players to lead the Islanders in scoring during John Tavares' nine-year tenure with the team; however, Okposo did it in a season in which Tavares was hurt, whereas Barzal did it in a season in which they both played the full 82 games.

Following the departure of Tavares during the 2018 off-season, Barzal began the 2018–19 season centering the Islanders' top line with Anthony Beauvillier and Josh Bailey. On December 29, Barzal scored a natural hat-trick in a 4–0 win over the Toronto Maple Leafs, becoming the first Islanders player to score a hat-trick against the Maple Leafs since Mike Bossy on March 20, 1986. On January 3, 2019, Barzal was named to the 2019 NHL All-Star Game. Barzal finished the season with 62 points (18 goals and 44 assists), leading the Islanders in both points and assists.

Barzal won the fastest skater competition at the 2020 NHL All-Star Skills Competition.

In the 2020 Stanley Cup playoffs, Barzal scored his first playoff overtime winner against the Washington Capitals in Game 3 to give the Islanders a 3–0 series lead. The Islanders ended up winning the series 4–1 to face the Philadelphia Flyers in the second round, whom the Islanders beat in seven games. The Islanders lost to eventual Stanley Cup champion Tampa Bay Lightning in six games in the Eastern Conference Finals.

On January 11, 2021, Barzal was signed to a reported three-year, $21 million contract with the Islanders.

On October 4, 2022, Barzal signed an eight-year, $73.2 million contract extension with the Islanders. On January 1, 2023, in his 400th NHL regular season game, Barzal scored his 100th career goal in a 4–1 loss to the Seattle Kraken.

International play

Barzal helped Canada capture the bronze medal at the 2014 IIHF World U18 Championships and won gold at the 2014 Ivan Hlinka Memorial Tournament. Barzal was again named to the Canada roster the following year to compete at the 2015 IIHF World U18 Championship, where he again won bronze.

Barzal was selected as an alternate captain for Canada at the 2017 World Junior Ice Hockey Championships. He helped guide Canada to a silver medal and was one of the top ten scorers in the tournament.

On April 12, 2018, Barzal was named to Canada's senior team to compete at the 2018 IIHF World Championship.

Personal life
Barzal speaks fluent French, having undergone French immersion in school; as a result, he has a very close friendship with former Islanders teammate Anthony Beauvillier, whom he met when the two played for Canada at the 2015 World U18 Championship.

Career statistics

Regular season and playoffs

International

Awards and honours

 The Hockey News, Teemu Selanne Award (Best Rookie) - 2018

References

External links
 

1997 births
Living people
Calder Trophy winners
Canadian expatriate ice hockey players in the United States
Canadian ice hockey centres
Coquitlam Express players
Ice hockey people from British Columbia
National Hockey League first-round draft picks
New York Islanders draft picks
New York Islanders players
People from Coquitlam
Sportspeople from British Columbia
Seattle Thunderbirds players